Don Diego Rivelino Alfredo Poeder (born 3 April 1972) is a former Dutch professional boxer. After his pro debut in 1994, Poeder was undefeated for 21 consecutive boxing matches. He gained the WBU cruiserweight title with a knock out over American Terry Ray in 1997, defending it once against Courtney Butler before falling to former world champion Robert Daniels in a bid for the IBO title.

Early life 
Poeder was born on the 3rd of April 1972 in Rotterdam. He grew up in Spangen neighbourhood in Rotterdam and later moved to Westkruiskade same city.

At the age of 16 Poeder decides to embrace kickboxing and sought to join a kickboxing school in Rotterdam.

Amateur career 
Poeder joined the kickboxing school "Silent Dragon Holland" in 1988 having as a trainer Enric Gunning, the bronze medal winner at the first world kickboxing championship W.A.K.O. World Championships in 1978.

During his time at "Silent Dragon Holland" he realized that kickboxing was too demanding for his weak knees. Poeder received later corrective surgery on his knee. Gunning sees the potential in Poeder and accepted to train him for boxing. His training here lasted until 1991. During this time Gunning organized 3 boxing matches for Poeder. Poeder fought in an amateur boxing competition in the heavyweight class.

Poeder ended up in the Hoboken boxing school (renamed Leon's Boxing Gym) - school owned by former Dutch professional boxer Aad Jansen – triple Dutch champion at welterweight. During his years at the Hoboken boxing school Poeder had the chance to train directly with the experienced Aad Jansen - his first official boxing trainer and Wim van Klaveren (brother of Bep van Klaveren  - the only Dutch boxer to have won an Olympic gold medal ). 
Poeder remained for a period of 2 years at Hoboken boxing school with approximately 15 matches as amateur.
While training at Hoboken, Poeder became the Dutch champion at amateur boxing, heavyweight category in 1992.

One year later in 1993 Poeder repeated his performance and won for the second time the Dutch title as an amateur at heavyweight category. This time Poeder trained at the boxing school Boxing'82 Rotterdam under the guidance of the trainer Frans van den Heerik.

Poeder made his international debut in 1993 at European Amateur Boxing Championships in Bursa, Turkey and his performance resulted in a silver medal for The Netherlands. In the fight for the silver medal at the heavyweight category he knocked out Danny Williams in the first round.

In the same year Poeder participated at the 14th Copenhagen Cup - Copenhagen, Denmark - November 1993, heavyweight class. During this championship, on November 26, 1993, Poeder scored a first round knockout victory over Wladimir Klitschko in the semifinals (being the only boxer to stop him in amateurs, before Ross Puritty repeated Poeder's successful performance over Klitschko in 1998, and the only boxer to ever stop him in the first round,) losing the finals to Juan Carlos Gómez.

Highlights
 Copenhagen Cup, Copenhagen, Denmark, November 1993:
 1/2: Defeated Wladimir Klitschko (Ukraine) RSC 1
 Finals: Lost to Juan Carlos Gómez (Cuba) 4–15
 European Championships, Bursa, Turkey, September 1993:
 1/8: Defeated Ion Mihai (Romania) RSC 1
 1/4: Defeated Krzysztof Rojek (Poland) RSC 2
 1/2: Defeated Danny Williams (England) KO 1
 Finals: Lost to Georgi Kandelaki (Georgia) 2–11

Professional career 
After a successful 1993 and a titles-full amateurs period (double Dutch champion and silver medal at the European Championship) Poeder followed the advice of his friends (and professional boxers) Raymond Joval (“Halleluja”) and Regilio Benito Tuur (“Turbo”) and went to the United States to train for a two-month period. 
In the United States Poeder trained at the Gleason's gym  in New York a boxing gym with tradition located in Brooklyn. Some of the fighters who trained at the Gleason’s gym include Jake LaMotta, Roberto Durán, Benny "Kid" Paret, Paulie Malignaggi, Gerry Coone, Muhammad Ali and Mike Tyson.

Soon after his arrival in Rotterdam Poeder was followed by the famous boxing manager Stan Hoffman – known for training several world champions, among them: James Toney, Hasim Rahman, Michael Bentt, Lucia Rijker and, later, Poeder. Hoffman met Poeder in Dudok in Rotterdam in a very informal sphere and on a table napkin drew what became Poeder’s professional boxing career.

Poeder accepted a move to the United States, with Hoffman as trainer and aiming for a career as a pro. His professional boxing debut takes place in 1994 at the Rotterdam Ahoy. The fight was in the cruiserweight class in the professional boxing league - the weightclass where Poeder fought as a professional for the rest of his boxing career. Poeder won the fight at the Ahoy by KO in the third round against Ken Woods.

The match in Rotterdam was the first of 21 undefeated boxing matches for Poeder. From one winning to another between 1994 and 1997 Poeder climbed the stairs of success culminating in winning the World Boxing Union (Original 1995-2004) cruiserweight title on the 15th of June 1997.

Poeder knocked Terry Ray out in the third round winning the fight through a technical knock-out (TKO).

The TKO and the KO were Poeder’s characteristic way of winning a fight during his career as a pro. According to official records Poeder won during his professional boxing career an overwhelming 80% of his fights through TKO or KO. The distribution of these techniques in the won fights is 50% (TKO) -50% (KO).

The city of Rotterdam acknowledged Poeder’s performance and handed him the title of Rotterdam’s Sportsman of the year 1997.

Poeder successfully defended the World Boxing Union cruiserweight title confirming once again his world champion position.

In 1998 Poeder faced a period of decline in his boxing career and lost his first professional fight while competing for the vacant International Boxing Organization World cruiserweight title.

Poeder was not seen again in the boxing ring from 1999 and until 2004. He won 3 major fights in a row, culminating with the Dutch cruiserweight title on the 10th of September 2005.

Although this was not the official end of DPoeder’s boxing career the fights that followed the Dutch cruiserweight title were title-less fights and with a local rather than international status (took place in The Netherlands or Belgium).

His official retiring match took place in 2016.

Professional record

Charity 

In 2014 Poeder organized together with Nouchka Fontijn an open training session for boxing fans. The revenue of this training was donated to the 3FM Serious Request cause.   
In 2012 he trained in the Erasmus Medical Centre in Rotterdam Frank – a fan of Poeder with a critical lung condition 
In 2007 Poeder attended the Global edition of  Dancing with the stars dancing contest.

References

External links

1972 births
Living people
Dutch male boxers
Heavyweight boxers
Boxers from Rotterdam
Dutch sportspeople of Surinamese descent